Darryl van de Velde (born 3 October 1951) is an Australian former professional rugby league footballer, coach and administrator. He played club football in Queensland for Souths and represented his state on one occasion in 1977. After playing he coached the Brisbane Rugby League premiership's Redcliffe side in 1986 and 1987, taking his club to consecutive grand finals. He was then replaced by Graham Olling.

Van de Velde was part of an unsuccessful syndicate to form the first New South Wales Rugby League premiership club in Queensland. He then embarked on a coaching career in England with Castleford in 1988, Darryl van de Velde was the coach in Castleford's 12–28 defeat by Wigan in the 1991–92 Challenge Cup Final during the 1991–92 season at Wembley Stadium, London on Saturday 2 May 1992, in front of a crowd of 77,386, before leaving in 1993. Van de Velde then became the Chief Executive Officer of the new South Queensland Crushers club of the ARL premership. He later coached Huddersfield and then joined Warrington Wolves in March 1997, spending five years at the club, but he failed to win a trophy before leaving in 2001. He returned to Australia, and became a board member of the Queensland Rugby League in 2013.

References

External links
QRL profile

1950 births
Living people
Australian chief executives
Australian rugby league administrators
Australian rugby league coaches
Australian rugby league players
Castleford Tigers coaches
Huddersfield Giants coaches
Queensland rugby league team players
Redcliffe Dolphins coaches
South Queensland Crushers
Souths Logan Magpies players
Warrington Wolves coaches